Piano and String Quartet is a composition by American avant-garde composer Morton Feldman. It was commissioned by the Kronos Quartet and pianist Aki Takahashi, who premiered the piece at the 7th annual New Music America Festival in Los Angeles and released a studio recording in 1993.

Background

Feldman composed Piano and String Quartet in 1985 at the age of 59. It was among his final major completed works. He wrote the composition with the Kronos Quartet and Takahashi in mind as its performers. It was commissioned for the seventh New Music America Festival in Los Angeles. He wrote out the score by hand, as he had done for most other compositions of that period.

On November 2, 1985, the Kronos Quartet and Takahashi premiered the piece at New Music America. The performance took place at the Leo S. Bing Theater in the Los Angeles County Museum of Art, beginning at 5p.m. and lasting 68½ minutes. A recording of the premiere was broadcast at 8p.m. on KUSC, the region's local classical music radio station.

Less than two years after the premiere of Piano and String Quartet, Feldman died of pancreatic cancer at the age of 61. Interest in the composer's music grew rapidly in the period after his death and his previously scarce discography was populated with numerous new recordings, mostly on independent labels. In a 1994 interview, Harrington said the following about the Kronos Quartet's work with the composer:

Another great admirer of Piano and String Quartet, the minimalist composer Steve Reich, encountered the piece years after its premiere. Reich regarded Feldman as an early influence and a friend, but they had lost touch in the 1980s: "when Feldman started writing longer pieces," he later wrote, "I foolishly didn't take the time to listen to them and Feldman drifted out of my musical consciousness." After Feldman died, Reich belatedly sought out his final works and was astonished by their sophistication. According to Reich, Piano and String Quartet "is the most beautiful work of his that I know... I wanted to call him, to tell him, that I had missed the boat with his late pieces, to ask how he made them—but was no longer possible."

Music
Piano and String Quartet is a chamber music composition scored for piano, two violins, viola, and cello, following the standard instrumentation used in most piano quintets since the early 19th century. Feldman's piece is regarded among the most innovative piano quintets of late 20th century, alongside quintets by Rochberg and Schnittke.

Feldman composed the piece during what is now considered to be his late period, spanning 1977 until his death in 1987. In his late-period compositions, Feldman's central concern turned from timbre—i.e., the textural quality of sound—to perception of time. Piano and String Quartet typifies the composer's late-period preoccupation with time and memory. The most salient qualities of Piano and String Quartet are extremes of duration and repetition. The score contains 810 bars. A typical performance takes approximately 80–90 minutes, much longer than most music written by his peers in the avant-garde or even his own early works. However, it is only moderate length by the standard of his late works. Most of his later works last one to two hours, with a handful that endure for three hours or longer. An uninterrupted performance of his longest work—String Quartet II (1983), also composed for the Kronos Quartet—typically lasts six hours; its exceptionally long runtime influenced Feldman to write Piano and String Quartet as a much shorter piece for the quartet.

As its title suggests, the piece sets the piano and string quartet apart as two distinct, almost detached entities. For the entirety of the piece, the musicians follow a simple pattern: the string quartet plays a sustained chord, and the pianist plays an arpeggiated or "broken" chord. The string instruments occasionally play the same pitch, creating a unison rather than a chord. After about 50 minutes, the string instruments sometimes play pizzicato, plucking rather than bowing. The sustain pedal of the piano remains pressed down for the entire performance, which indefinitely lengthens the notes and causes sympathetic resonance among the strings.

The harmonic content shifts throughout, but without a traditional sense of musical development. Its stillness has drawn comparisons to ambient music. But contrary to its apparent lack of direction, its structure is highly complex. According to the Rough Guide to classical music, the piece initially "seems to have no beginning or end, no intention or direction"; however, the listener's attention is gradually enhanced and subtle changes in tone become magnified as it progresses, until even the subtlest differences take on the capacity to impart "a resonance and an intensity that is startling." Upon reading the score, Steve Reich found that many of its "quiet mysterious chords" were in fact "inversions of themselves", and that  of material were never exact repetitions". A cello motif recurs throughout, albeit in transposed variations.

Recordings
As of December 2021, five recordings of Feldman's Piano and String Quartet have been commercially released.

Kronos Quartet with Aki Takahashi (1993)

The Kronos Quartet and Takahashi recorded the piece in November 1991 at Skywalker Ranch in Nicasio, California, with production by Judith Sherman. By that time, the Kronos Quartet and Sherman had become frequent collaborators. She had produced some of the quartet's most acclaimed albums, including their 1990 studio recording of George Crumb's Black Angels. Sherman called the Skywalker facilities "the most perfect recording room", noting that the reverberation was distributed remarkably evenly across the frequency band.

The album was released on September 28, 1993, through Nonesuch Records, a subsidiary of Elektra that had been the quartet's record label since 1985. It was positively received by critics. John von Rhein of the Chicago Tribune praised the performers' "miraculous control, dedication and concentration". Although he cautioned that less-adventurous listeners may find the recording to be "the aural equivalent of Chinese water torture, made all the more excruciating by its quiet dynamics and lack of rhythmic, melodic or harmonic gesture", he noted that  will find Feldman's tranquil, self-contained sounds a balm for ears and spirit long since turned off by the busy density that characterizes so much new music." Art Lange called it  unlike any other" in a review for the classical music magazine Fanfare, though he hedged that those already "familiar with Feldman's idiom" would likely consider the newly recorded piece "different enough, without making any major breakthroughs". The Wires Andy Hamilton wrote "I'm not sure I fully understand what it's about, but this composer is certainly a deep cat."

Glenn Swan of AllMusic called the recording  and wrote that the musicians "conjure up the ghost of Feldman to wander the streets of New York as if they were abandoned. This single piece, over 79 minutes in length, is like an icy flower that blooms almost undetected." Reviewing the Kronos Quartet for the 1995 Spin Alternative Record Guide, critic Alex Ross gave the record a perfect score—the highest rating for the quartet's discography—and called it "the group's major achievement so far". In the 2002 book Classical Music: The Listener's Companion, Raymond S. Tuttle recommended it as an "excellent" and comparatively accessible entry point for a listener new to Feldman's music: "Once you surrender traditional expectations about what music is supposed to do, you're overwhelmed by its ethereal beauty". In an article recommending the best music for each hour of the day, rock musician Elvis Costello cited it as the best record to listen to at 4a.m., writing "Feldman's almost seamless fabric of music... is both hypnotic and transporting". When Takahashi returned to Los Angeles in 2006 for her first concert there since the 1985 premiere of Piano and String Quartet, Mark Swed said her recording with the Kronos Quartet was "now a classic in the modern chamber repertory".

Sherman received the Grammy Award for Producer of the Year, Classical at the 36th Annual Grammy Awards in March 1994. The studio version of Piano and String Quartet with Takahashi appeared on the third disc of the 1998 compilation Kronos Quartet: 25 Years, a ten-CD box set.

Subsequent recordings

Ives Ensemble (2001)

Tilbury and the Smith Quartet (2009)

John Tilbury and the Smith Quartet played the piece at the 2006 Huddersfield Contemporary Music Festival on November 26. Selected live recordings from those performances were released in three volumes by Matchless Recordings in audio-only DVD format, which allowed for uninterrupted playback of the long recordings on a single disc. Just shy of 90 minutes, it is the longest recorded performance of the piece. The Smith Quartet played without vibrato and loosened their bows to enable longer, softer tones.

Colin Clarke of the journal Tempo praised "the utmost delicacy" of Tilbury's playing and compared the recording favorably to the original: "The sense of space, so evident in the Nonesuch version, is here even more entrenched—there is almost a feeling of risk in how long the gaps between statements of the prevailing arpeggio figure can last." Critics named it among the 10 best "Modern Composition" releases of 2010 in The Wires year-in-review Rewind issue.

Vicki Ray and the Eclipse Quartet (2011)

Opus Posth Ensemble and Mikhail Dubov (2014)
The CD was released by Long Arms Records, a label co-founded by the composer Sergey Kuryokhin. Opus Posth performed the piece once more for a CD release concert at the Moscow International House of Music on January 31, 2015.

Notes

References

Bibliography

External links
 Piano and String Quartet sheet music from Universal Edition
 Piano and String Quartet at KronosQuartet.org

1985 compositions
Compositions by Morton Feldman
New Music America
Feldman
Music dedicated to ensembles or performers
Minimalistic compositions
Minimal music albums
1993 classical albums
Kronos Quartet albums
Nonesuch Records albums